Long Pigs is a 2007 mockumentary comedy-horror  film about two documentary filmmakers who follow a serial killer who has a taste for cooking with human flesh.  Acting and the special effects were provided by Chris Bridges.

Filming took place in Toronto, Ontario, Canada.

Plot
Two desperate and young filmmakers stumble upon the ultimate subject, a 33-year-old cannibalistic serial killer named Anthony McAllister, who has agreed to let them document every aspect of his horrifically violent life-style.  Initially terrified, the filmmakers get to know Anthony as a person. They even begin to identify with his ecological and philosophical justifications for his cannibalistic lifestyle.

It's only when they investigate further that the filmmakers begin to doubt Anthony's accounts of his past. Tensions noticeably rise as the filmmakers continue to confront Anthony on his conflicting stories and ever-changing philosophies. During an awkward interview, the filmmakers interview Merle, the father of a young girl who was abducted and never found. This abduction was Anthony's first child victim. Merle welcomes them into his home and gives them a heart-felt experience that even Anthony is touched by.

As the documentary reaches its conclusion, Anthony begins to become uncomfortably aware of how much of his life he has revealed to these filmmakers. In a final interview with Anthony, a deadly confrontation erupts, and all that remains is a broken camera and this footage.

Cast 
 Anthony Alviano as Anthony McAlistar
 Jean-Marc Fontaine as the restaurant manager
 Paul Fowles as Merle, the father of the missing child
 Shane Harbinson  as Det. Ken Walby
 Roger King  as Tony Prince, the radio host
 Kelly McIntosh  as Rebecca Stapleton (as Kelly MacIntosh)
 Brad Mittelman  as Simon Sullivan
 John Terranova  as John Vierra
 Vik Sahay  as Dr. Hooshangi
 Barbara Walsh as Lucy, the prostitute

Awards
Best Picture: Moving Image Film Fest (Toronto)
Best Picture: Mockfest Film Fest (LA)
Best Actor: Mockfest Film Fest (LA)
Best Horror: Evil City Film Fest (NYC)
Best Horror: International Horror & Sci-Fi Fest (PHX)
Best Feature: Texas Frightmare Weekend (TX)
Best Mockudrama: Ricon International Film Fest (PR)

DVD release
After three years of being screened at select theaters, Long Pigs was released on DVD on  through Big Bite Entertainment.  Limited editions of the DVD included edible jerky supposedly prepared by in-character Anthony McAlistar.

References

External links
 
 
 
 

2007 films
2000s comedy horror films
2007 horror films
English-language Canadian films
Films shot in Toronto
Films about cannibalism
Found footage films
Canadian slasher films
Canadian serial killer films
2007 comedy films
2000s exploitation films
Canadian splatter films
2000s English-language films
2000s Canadian films